Sırrı Atalay (1919-1985) was a Turkish civil servant and politician.

Born in Pasinler, Erzurum Province, in 1919, he graduated from Ankara University, Law School. He served as a judge and a lawyer in various cities.

He joined Republican People's Party (CHP) and was elected as  MP from Kars Province in the 9th Parliament of Turkey. He kept his seat in the next four parliamentary terms. In 1961 he was elected as senator from Kars Province up to 1980.

During the 28th government of Turkey he was appointed as the Minister of Justice between 16 December 1964 – 29 February 1965. Between 16 June 1977 – 6 November 1979 he was elected as the speaker of the Turkish senate. On 1 June 1983 he was one of the former politicians who were temporarily taken under custody in a camp named Zincirbozan for their political activities during the military rule.

He died in 1985. He was married and father of one.

References

1919 births
1985 deaths
Republican People's Party (Turkey) politicians
Ministers of Justice of Turkey
Members of the 10th Parliament of Turkey
Members of the 11th Parliament of Turkey
Members of the 9th Parliament of Turkey
Members of the 12th Parliament of Turkey
Members of the 13th Parliament of Turkey
Members of the 14th Parliament of Turkey
Members of the 15th Parliament of Turkey
Members of the 16th Parliament of Turkey
People from Pasinler
Members of the Senate of the Republic (Turkey)
Deputies of Kars